Sannan may refer to:
 Sannan, a former town in Hyōgo Prefectur, Japan
 King of Sannan, a title claimed by a line of local rulers on Okinawa Island from the late 14th century to the early 15th centuries
 Steinkjersannan, Norway